Senator Wemple may refer to:

Edward Wemple (1843–1920), New York State Senate
William W. Wemple (1862–1933), New York State Senate